Prudence Lee (died 10 April 1652) was an English woman who was executed for murder. 

She was put on trial for murdering her spouse Philip Lee. Philip Lee was reportedly "a very wicked liver and kept the company of strange women" and habitually unfaithful, and Prudence Lee had stabbed him with a knife after a public argument resulting from her discovering him in the company of another woman at an alehouse in Rotten Row on Old Street. 

She was judged guilty as charged. Since the murder of a husband was defined as petty treason, the punishment was death by burning. She confessed to have "been a lewd liver and much given to cursing" and hope that her case would serve as a warning to others.

She was executed at Smithfield in London by burning alive at the stake on 10 April 1652. She is known as the last woman to be executed in England by burning alive; while the punishment remained on paper until the execution of Catherine Murphy in 1789, practice after Prudence Lee became to strangle the condemned on a low gibbet before covering her with faggots and setting the stake alight.

Her case was the subject of a contemporary pamphlet treatise, The Witch of Wapping (1652).

References

  
 

17th-century English people
Witch trials in England
People executed for witchcraft
1652 deaths
17th-century executions by England
People executed by England and Wales by burning